Calexico is a city in southern Imperial County, California. Situated on the Mexican border, it is linked economically with the much larger city of Mexicali, the capital of the Mexican state of Baja California. Calexico, along with six other incorporated Imperial County cities, forms part of the larger populated area known as the Imperial Valley.

First explored by Europeans in the 18th century, Calexico began as a small tent community which was ultimately incorporated in 1908.

Etymology
The name of the city is a portmanteau of California and Mexico. The originally proposed names were Santo Tomas or Thomasville. Mexicali is a similarly named city directly across the international border from Calexico, its name being a portmanteau of the words "Mexico" and "California".

History
The expedition of Spanish explorer Juan Bautista de Anza traveled through the area some time between 1775 and 1776, during Spanish rule. The trail through Calexico was designated as a historical route by the State of California.

Founding
Calexico began as a tent city of the Imperial Land Company; it was founded in 1899, and incorporated in 1908. The Imperial Land Company converted desert land into a fertile setting for year-round agriculture. The first post office in Calexico opened in 1902.

2010 earthquake 

On April 4, 2010, the El Mayor earthquake caused moderate to heavy damage throughout Calexico and across the border in Mexicali. A state of emergency was declared and officials cordoned off First and Second streets between Paulin and Heber Avenues. Glass and debris littered the streets of downtown Calexico and two buildings partially collapsed. The Calexico water treatment plant sustained severe damage.

Geography

Calexico's location provides easy overnight trucking access to all those transportation hubs plus the ports of Long Beach, California, and Ensenada, Baja California, Mexico.

Calexico is served by State Routes 98, 7 and 111, with direct connection to Interstate 8 (5 miles north) and State Route 86. There are eighteen regular and irregular common carriers for intrastate and interstate truck service to Calexico.

Rail service is provided by Union Pacific Railroad, and connects with the main line to Portland, Oregon; Rock Island, Illinois; Tucumcari, New Mexico; St. Louis, Missouri; and New Orleans, Louisiana.

Within city limits is Calexico International Airport, the U.S. Customs and Border Protection check-point for private passenger and air-cargo flights entering the U.S. from Mexico. Private charter services are also available there.

Climate
Calexico has a subtropical hot-desert climate (BWh), according to the Köppen climate classification system. In December 1932, the city experienced a rare snowfall. Rainfall usually occurs in the winter months of December, January and February. Although summer is extremely dry in Calexico, there are occasional thunderstorms. In 2008, during the months of July and August there were several heavy thunderstorms that let down large amounts of rain and hail.  Summer rainfall in the city is infrequent. During winter time, Calexico is sometimes affected by winter rain showers.

The summer temperatures in Calexico are very hot, with most of those days having temperatures at or above . However, the hot desert climate seen in Calexico is actually not unusual for similar parallel cities such as, for example, Baghdad, Iraq.

The area has a large amount of sunshine year round due to its stable descending air and high pressure.

Demographics

The 2010 United States Census reported that Calexico had a population of 38,572. The racial makeup of Calexico was 23,150 (60.0%) White, 134 (0.3%) African American, 204 (0.5%) Native American, 504 (1.3%) Asian, 21 (0.1%) Pacific Islander, 12,920 (33.5%) from other races, and 1,639 (4.2%) from two or more races. Hispanic or Latino of any race were 37,354 persons (96.8%).

The Census reported that 38,472 people (99.7% of the population) lived in households, 100 (0.3%) lived in non-institutionalized group quarters, and 0 (0%) were institutionalized.

There were 10,116 households, out of which 5,759 (56.9%) had children under the age of 18 living in them, 5,767 (57.0%) were opposite-sex married couples living together, 2,319 (22.9%) had a female householder with no husband present, 595 (5.9%) had a male householder with no wife present.  There were 316 (3.1%) unmarried opposite-sex partnerships, and 61 (0.6%) same-sex married couples or partnerships, while 1,200 households (11.9%) were made up of individuals, and 675 (6.7%) had someone living alone who was 65 years of age or older. The average household size was 3.80.  There were 8,681 families (85.8% of all households); the average family size was 4.09.

The population was spread out, with 12,011 people (31.1%) under the age of 18, 4,262 people (11.0%) aged 18 to 24, 9,332 people (24.2%) aged 25 to 44, 8,559 people (22.2%) aged 45 to 64, and 4,408 people (11.4%) who were 65 years of age or older.  The median age was 31.8 years. For every 100 females, there were 89.6 males.  For every 100 females age 18 and over, there were 84.2 males.

The homeowner vacancy rate was 2.6%; the rental vacancy rate was 3.1%.  22,155 people (57.4% of the population) lived in owner-occupied housing units and 16,317 people (42.3%) lived in rental housing units.

Government
The City of Calexico operates under a City Council/City Manager form of government. The City Council consists of five Council Members, elected to overlapping four-year term. The Mayor and Mayor Pro-Tem are chosen from among the five council members and rotate on an annual basis.

The Mayor presides at council meetings, where all official policies and laws of the city are enacted. The members of the Calexico City Council set policy and appoint commissions and committees that study the present and future needs of Calexico.

The other two elected officials in the City of Calexico are the City Clerk and City Treasurer. Each of them is elected directly by the voters and serves a four-year term.

The Calexico branch of the Imperial County Superior Court system was officially renamed on Saturday, December 19, 1992, in honor of Legaspi family members Henry, Victor and Luis Legaspi as the Legaspi Municipal Court Complex.

Politics

The current mayor is Raul Ureña, and the mayor pro tem is Gloria Romo. The other council members are Gilberto Manzanarez, Javier Moreno, and Camilo Garcia.

In recent years, Calexico has overwhelmingly supported Democratic Party candidates for president. In seven of the last eight presidential elections, the Democrat has received over 70% of the vote.

Education

Colleges and universities

Post-secondary education is available at the Imperial Valley Campus of San Diego State University, and at Imperial Valley College ( to the north). In addition, there are more than 20 local agencies and programs providing vocational training which can be tailored to the specific needs of potential employers.

Public schools
The Calexico Unified School District serves city residents. Calexico has 7 elementary schools, 2 junior high schools and 2 high schools:

Elementary
 Grades K–6
 Kennedy Gardens Elementary – Home of the Eagles
 Allen and Helen Mains Elementary – Home of the Trojans
 Rockwood Elementary – Home of the Rockets
 Blanche Charles Elementary – Home of the Dolphins
 Jefferson Elementary – Home of the Tigers
 Dool Elementary – Home of the Cougars
 Cesar Chavez Elementary – Home of the Lobos

Junior high schools

Grades 7–8
 Willam Moreno Jr. High – Home of the Aztecs
 Enrique Camarena Junior High School – Home of the Firebirds

High schools
Grades 9–12
 Calexico High School 9th Campus - Home of the Bulldogs
 Calexico High School – Home of the Bulldogs (10th-12th)
 Aurora High School – Home of the Eagles

Public charter school (Independent Study)
RAI Online Charter School—raicharter.net (K–12, tuition-free)

Adult education schools
 Robert F. Morales Adult Education Center
 Independent Studies Office

Private schools
Calexico Mission School, a Seventh-day Adventist Academy operated by the Southeastern California Conference in Riverside, CA provides private religious education in Calexico from kindergarten through twelfth grade.

Our Lady of Guadalupe Academy (Home to the Bees), and Vincent Memorial Catholic High School (Home to the Scots), Roman Catholic schools operated by the Roman Catholic Diocese of San Diego, are also in Calexico.

Infrastructure

Transportation
Calexico is served by the privately owned Calexico Transit, LA Shuttle and Numero Uno Shuttle and the publicly owned Imperial Valley Transit for local transit. Calexico is also served by Greyhound Lines.

Freight rail service is provided by Union Pacific Railroad's Calexico Subdivision.

Utilities
Calexico's public works departments operates water and sewer service for the city.

Community

Calexico generally identifies as part of the larger Imperial Valley region, which includes the El Centro metropolitan area, as do the rest of the cities in the county.

Notable sites
Hotel De Anza (Hotel establishment notable for its history and having served celebrities and public figures)
Calexico Carnegie Library (Carnegie library built in 1918 and added to the National Register of Historic Places in 2005)
US Inspection Station – Calexico (Historically used as the original port of entry during the early 20th century – was closed and added to the National Register of Historic Places in 1992)
Camp Salvation (Refugee camp established in 1849 by Lieut. Cave for emigrants coming from the Southern Emigrant Trail during the California Gold Rush – was registered as a California Historical Landmarks site in 1965.)
Camp John H. Beacom – a semipermanent camp named after Colonel John H. Beacom (6th infantry) garrisoned in Calexico during World War I for patrolling duties. The site was abandoned in 1920 according to cavalry journals.
Camp Calexico was another post used for patrolling duties by Colonel W. G. Schreibe and his infantry in 1914
Mount Signal Solar (One of the largest PV solar farms in the world)

Red Ribbon Week

Red Ribbon Week, a national observance dedicated to spreading awareness about the prevention of drugs and violence (especially in schools) originated within the city of Calexico during the mid to late 1980s as a tribute to DEA officer Enrique "Kiki" Camarena. Red Ribbon Week campaigns were pushed forward by Nancy Reagan.

Sister city 
  Mexicali, Mexico (since April 28, 2017) sd

Media 
The city media includes national public television stations, county-wide radio stations (some of which feature nation-wide or California state-wide programing), county-wide print publications such as Imperial Valley Press as well as a few locally managed general interest publications.

In popular culture
Film and television
 1983 film Curtis Hanson's Losin' It starring Tom Cruise was filmed in Calexico
 1997 film The Game starring Michael Douglas; some scenes in Mexicali were shot through the chain link fence (camera and crew in Calexico) between the US and Mexico
The film Sky High written and directed by Lynn Reynolds revolves around Calexico
1949 film The Walking Hills directed by John Sturges takes place in Mexicali and Calexico
The town is featured in the series Knight Rider during the episode "Mouth of The Snake". Michael Knight travels there to meet with the widow of a murdered federal lawyer.
 In the film, Bordertown starring Jennifer Lopez, Antonio Banderas and Martin Sheen one scene was shot in the Calexico port of entry.
 In the episode of Defiance, "The Serpent's Egg", the lawkeeper travels to Calexico.
 On ABC's hit show Modern Family, the main characters travel to Calexico in search of a child to adopt where the city's people and environment are exaggerated with stereotypes for comedic effect.
 In California's Gold Episode 204, Huell Howser visits Calexico.
 The town in Seth MacFarlane's Bordertown, Mexifornia is a parody of Calexico
 The town is mentioned in first episode of Narcos: Mexico (which was originally intended to be the fourth season of the Netflix original series Narcos). The TV series Narcos: Mexico portrays Enrique Camarena, DEA agent and Calexico High School alumnus, amongst its main characters.
 In season 19; episode 2 of BBC's Top Gear, starring members of the show race in sports cars from Las Vegas, Nevada to Calexico
 The 2007 independent film Descension was filmed in Calexico
 In 2007 Bullrun was a television series which features 12 teams competing in a 4,000-mile (6,400 km) 18-day road rally to win the grand prize of US$200,000. Bullrun used a modified 12-car rally format. The rally ended in Calexico.
 In the 2013 film The Golden Dream, the main characters look at Calexico through the fence in Mexicali before crossing with the help of drug traffickers.

Music
The band Calexico is named after the town
Rock band Red Hot Chili Peppers sing about Calexico in their song "Encore" from their 2016 album, The Getaway

Literature
 A narcotics officer in Michael Connelly's The Black Ice is named after the town
 Johnny Shaw's A Jimmy Veeder Fiasco novel series takes place in various parts of Imperial County including Calexico
In the novel Against All Enemies by Tom Clancy one scene is set on the Calexico/Mexicali border
 Journalist and film maker Peter Laufer writes about the city in his books ¡Calexico!:True Lives of the Borderlands and Calexico: Hope and Hysteria in the California Borderlands (co-written with Markos Kounalakis)
The book Memories of Calexico: Curse or Blessing? by Antonio A. Velasquez compiles several anecdotes about Calexico
Jim Davidson's novel Postmarked Calexico makes references to the city

Notable people

 Enrique Camarena (DEA agent)
 Enrique Castillo (Actor)
 Emilio Delgado (Actor)
 Dan Navarro (Singer-songwriter, voice actor)
 Bob Huff (California senator)
 Ruben Niebla (Major League Baseball player)
 Danny Villanueva, (NFL placekicker and punter)
 Eugenio Elorduy Walther (Politician)
 Bob Wilson (U.S. Congressman)
 Allen Strange (Composer)
 Takashi Kijima (Photographer)
 William Kesling (Architect)
 Primo Villanueva (Football player)
 Mariano-Florentino Cuellar (Justice)
 Henry Lozano (Politician)
 Ben Hulse (Politician)
 Jeff Cravath (Football player and coach)
Bill Binder (restaurateur and owner of Philippe's in Downtown Los Angeles)

See also 

Imperial County
Imperial Valley
Calexico–Mexicali

References

External links

 
 Calexico Chamber of Commerce

 
Incorporated cities and towns in California
Cities in Imperial County, California
Mexico–United States border crossings

Communities in the Lower Colorado River Valley
Imperial Valley
Populated places in the Colorado Desert
Populated places established in 1908
1908 establishments in California